The Cyclo-cross Grand Prix Lille Métropole is a cyclo-cross race held in Roubaix, France, as part of the UCI Cyclo-cross World Cup. It was first run in 2006 and became a World Cup event in the 2008−2009 and the 2009−2010 season. 

After a hiatus Roubaix returned to the World Cup for the 2012−2013 season. It was also to have been a round of the 2014-2015 World Cup but the race had to be cancelled.

Past winners

References
 Results

UCI Cyclo-cross World Cup
Cycle races in France
Cyclo-cross races
Recurring sporting events established in 2006
2006 establishments in France